Mansfield is a city in Scott and Sebastian counties Arkansas, United States. The Sebastian County portion of the city is part of the Fort Smith, Arkansas-Oklahoma Metropolitan Statistical Area. As of the 2010 Census, the population was 1,139. The population was 1,097 at the 2000 census.

History
Mansfield was platted in 1887 when the railroad was extended to that point. The city most likely was named for William W. Mansfield, a Justice of the Arkansas Supreme Court.

Geography
Mansfield is located at  (35.058985, -94.246321).

Demographics

2020 census

As of the 2020 United States census, there were 1,053 people, 473 households, and 344 families residing in the city.

2013
As of the census of 2013, there were 1,121 people in 440 households, including 289 families, in the city. The racial makeup of the city was 95.81% White, 0.09% Black or African American, 1.09% Native American, 0.46% Asian, 0.91% from other races, and 1.64% from two or more races.  3.37% of the population were Hispanic or Latino of any race.

Of the 440 households 33.6% had children under the age of 18 living with them, 52.3% were married couples living together, 10.5% had a female householder with no husband present, and 34.3% were non-families. 31.6% of households were one person and 15.7% were one person aged 65 or older.  The average household size was 2.49 and the average family size was 3.13.

The age distribution was 27.9% under the age of 18, 10.7% from 18 to 24, 28.5% from 25 to 44, 18.7% from 45 to 64, and 14.2% 65 or older.  The median age was 35 years. For every 100 females, there were 91.4 males.  For every 100 females age 18 and over, there were 87.0 males.

The median household income was $26,938 and the median family income  was $35,000. Males had a median income of $28,534 versus $19,063 for females. The per capita income for the city was $13,012.  About 13.2% of families and 18.0% of the population were below the poverty line, including 32.1% of those under age 18 and 12.9% of those age 65 or over.

Education
Public education for early childhood, elementary and secondary students are zoned to attend Mansfield School District, which leads to graduation from Mansfield High School.

Notable persons
Laverne Bonner Hunt, 

 Mark Darr, former Arkansas lieutenant governor, graduated in 1991 from Mansfield High School.

See also
 List of cities and towns in Arkansas

References

External links

 The City of Mansfield, Arkansas Official Website of Mansfield, Arkansas

Cities in Arkansas
Cities in Scott County, Arkansas
Cities in Sebastian County, Arkansas
Fort Smith metropolitan area